Mount Meister is a mountain,  high, on the west side of Priestley Glacier, surmounting the north end of Nash Ridge of the Eisenhower Range, in Victoria Land, Antarctica. It was mapped by the United States Geological Survey from surveys and U.S. Navy air photos, 1955–63, and was named by the Advisory Committee on Antarctic Names for Laurent J. Meister, a geologist at McMurdo Station in the 1965–66 season.

References

Mountains of Victoria Land
Scott Coast